Labuan Shipyard and Engineering (LSE) is a Malaysian shipbuilding company based in the East Malaysian island of Labuan, Sabah. It is the biggest shipyard in Borneo.

History
LSE was formed in 1972 and its main operations centre located on a 60-acre fabrication yard in Labuan, Sabah. LSE is a subsidiary of Radimax Group Sdn. Bhd. and Sapura Energy Berhad (formerly known as Sapura Kencana Petroleum Berhad). The company main business includes both the shipbuilding and ship repair and oil and gas industry.

Facilities and capabilities

Facilities
Located on 60-acre yard in strategic locations in Asia Pacific region, LSE owned a natural deep-water access and shelter from monsoons. LSE assets also includes:

16,000-deadweight tonne ship handling
24,000-tonne fabrication output per year
200-tonne tested bollard pull testing facility
7,000-tonne shiplift system
12,000 and 3,000-tonne capacity of loadout skidway and quay.

Capabilities
LSE main business is the shipbuilding and ship repair. This includes both for commercial and naval vessels.

Other than shipbuilding and ship repair, LSE also owned an expertise in offshore and onshore facilities fabrication and maintenance and also civil engineering.

References

1972 establishments in Malaysia
Shipbuilding companies of Malaysia
Shipbuilding companies
Defense companies of Malaysia
Privately held companies of Malaysia